Chen Hsi-huang (born 18 December 1935) is a Taiwanese agriculturalist who served as Minister of Agriculture from 2000 to 2002.

Early life and education
Chen was born in Taipei (known as Taihoku under Japanese rule) and earned a bachelor's degree from National Taiwan University before obtaining a master's degree and doctorate from the University of Georgia in the United States.

Career
Chen worked for the Sino-American Joint Commission on Rural Reconstruction, a predecessor organization to the Council of Agriculture, upon his return to Taiwan. In 2000, he took office as head of the Minister of Agriculture. In this position, Chen was responsible for long-term disaster relief efforts resulting from the 1999 Jiji earthquake. He organized a disaster prevention center after a June 2000 aftershock, and worked to stop mudflows from causing further damage. Chen also ordered a six-year initiative to reduce the number of betel nut plantations in order to lessen the effects of soil erosion caused by betel nut trees. During his tenure as COA leader, Chen supported the work of rural credit cooperatives geared toward farmers and fishermen, and sought to lift restrictions on Chinese employees of Taiwanese fishermen. After Typhoon Toraji hit Taiwan in July 2001, Nantou County legislator Tsai Huang-liang stated that Chen's policies unfairly burdened betel nut producers, making them  scapegoats for erosion. Chen recognized that Nantou County should be reforested to prevent future typhoon damage, but rejected a proposal to use helicopters, stating that there were more effective ways to seed the mountainous area. It was reported that Chen would step down from the COA in January 2002, and he was eventually succeeded by Fan Chen-tsung.

References

1935 births
Living people
Politicians of the Republic of China on Taiwan from Taipei
Taiwanese agriculturalists
University of Georgia alumni
National Taiwan University alumni
Taiwanese Ministers of Agriculture